Paduka Sri Sultan Muzaffar Shah II ibni Almarhum Raja Mahmud (Jawi: سلطان مظفر شاه الثاني ابن المرحوم رجا محمود; died 1653) was the tenth Sultan of Perak who reigned from 1636 to 1653. He was the first Sultan of Perak to come from a different dynasty from the first nine Sultans of Perak. His paternal great grandmother, Raja Puspa Dewi, was the daughter of Sultan Mansur Shah I of Pahang.

Biography 
When Sultan Iskandar Muda, the well-known Sultan of Aceh, attacked and defeated Pahang in 1618, Sultan Ahmad Shah II (11th Sultan of Pahang) and his son, Raja Mughal, and many people of Pahang were captured and taken to Aceh. Among the few people who became prisoners of Aceh included a child named Raja Sulong, son of Raja Mahmud.

Reign 
In 1636, when Sultan Iskandar Muda died and the deceased's son-in-law, Raja Mughal, was appointed Sultan of Aceh with the title of Sultan Iskandar Thani Alauddin Mughayat Shah. In the same year, Sultan Iskandar Thani sent his distant cousin named Raja Sulong to become Sultan of Perak because at that time Perak was still under the auspices of the Aceh Sultanate. After Raja Sulong reached Perak, he was appointed as the 10th Sultan of Perak following the death of the 9th Sultan of Perak, Salehuddin, he used the title of Sultan Muzaffar Shah II.

Sultan Muzaffar Shah II married Raja Putri Fatima Putih, the great-granddaughter of Sultan Mansur Shah I of Perak and granddaughter of Sultan Abdul Ghafur Muhiuddin Shah of Pahang. The couple later had Raja Mahmud and Raja Mansur.

Dutch interference 
Before the Dutch defeated the Portuguese in Malacca in 1641, the Dutch came to Aceh to get permission from Sultan Iskandar Thani to buy tin in Perak. Sultan Iskandar Thani agreed to permit the Dutch. After that, the Dutch went to see Sultan Muzaffar Shah II to tell him about the news that the permission to buy tin in the state of Perak had been granted by Sultan Iskandar Thani. Sultan Muzaffar Shah II also then permitted the Dutch company to do business and buy tin in Perak. The Dutch had built houses where they did business near the banks of the Perak river.

Since then, the business of the Dutch in Perak went well until 1641. In 1641, Sultan Iskandar Thani died and his widow, Putri Sri Alam, who was the daughter of Sultan Iskandar Muda, was appointed as the Sultana of Aceh with the title Sultana Tajul Alam Safiatuddin Shah to replace her husband. But the glory days of the Aceh Sultanate declined and gradually weakened. Since then, the power and colonies of Aceh in the Malay Peninsula began to gradually weaken and were released one by one until the only state that remained under the control of Aceh for many years was Perak.

In mid-1641, a Dutch merchant named Jan Dircxen Puijit came to Perak with many merchandises to trade. Jan Dircxen Puijit went in to meet with Sultan Muzaffar Shah II and presented a letter and gift from the Dutch Governor (Johan van Twist) who was in Malacca. In the letter from the Dutch Governor, there was a proposal to the Sultan of Perak regarding stopping merchants from other nations from coming to buy tin in Perak. In addition, the Dutch Governor also suggested that Perak sell tin products only to the Netherlands. Sultan Muzaffar Shah II welcomed and returned the gift brought by Jan Dircxen Puijit with a sword and a dagger and awarded him the title Seri Johan Pahlawan. Moreover, Sultan Muzaffar Shah II also gave houses to the Dutch to replace their houses that were worn out where the Dutch traded. Sultan Muzaffar Shah II also stated that he felt very honored to buy merchandise from the Netherlands on the condition that each purchase was authorized by credit.

However, the proposal given by the Dutch Governor to the Sultan of Perak to prohibit other nations from buying tin products was still pending. The Sultan of Perak only stated that the matter would be brought to a meeting with the Orang-Orang Besar of Perak first. After a long time, the Sultan of Perak continued to be urged by the Dutch Governor to prevent other nations from buying tin products in Perak, but the Sultan remained adamant about not preventing other nations from buying tin in the state of Perak. It got to a point where the Sultan of Perak warned to take back the house that had been given to the Dutch during the reign of Jan Dircxen Puijit.

Because the Sultan of Perak did not want to give in to the Dutch's request, the Dutch started looking for ways to block the Javanese, Chinese, and Indians from coming to trade in Perak. Several Dutch ships were prepared to blockade the Perak river basin just to prevent the entry of other nations entering Perak to trade.

The restrictions that were made by the Dutch in the Perak river basin were later protested by the Perak state government. Furthermore, the Dutch then went to Aceh to explain their restrictions in Perak and the proposal to block other nations from buying tin in Perak. The Aceh government then instructed the Perak state government to not prevent other nations from buying tin products in the state of Perak. This is because the Netherlands can still buy the most tin from the state of Perak.

In 1650, a Governor-General named Cornelis van der Lijn sent a representative named Joan Truijtman to Aceh. When the Dutch representative arrived in Aceh, the Dutch forced Sultana Tajul Alam Safiatuddin Shah to make an agreement with the Dutch that only allowed the Dutch to buy tin products in Perak. Sultana Tajul Alam Safiatuddin Shah then accepted the agreement and ordered the state government of Perak to obey her orders. At that time, Perak, which was still under the control of Aceh, had to comply and obey the demands of the Aceh government. The agreement was signed by both parties on 15 August 1650. A year later, the Dutch plant in Kuala Perak was attacked and destroyed by the Malays. Not only that, many Dutch people were killed as a result of the attack. At that moment the Dutch Campaign stopped and no longer traded in Perak.

Death 
Sultan Muzaffar Shah II ruled Perak for 17 years from 1636–1653. He died in 1653 with the title Marhum Jalilullah and was buried in Air Mati.

References 

Sultans of Perak
1653 deaths
Royal House of Perak
Malay people
People of Malay descent
Muslim monarchs
Sultans
Sunni monarchs
People from Perak